Paris Saint-Germain Féminine have had eleven managers since 1999, of whom four have won at least one trophy. Gérard Prêcheur is the current manager. He has been in charge since August 2022.

The club won its maiden honour, the Division 2 championship, under Sébastien Thierry in 2001. He coached PSG for five years, being their longest-serving manager. Camillo Vaz led the Parisians to their first major trophy, the Coupe de France, in 2010. The capital side claimed its second French Cup title in 2018, with Bernard Mendy on the bench.

Steered by Olivier Echouafni, the Red and Blues were crowned Division 1 champions for the first time in 2021. PSG clinched their third French Cup title in 2022, under tenure of Didier Ollé-Nicolle. Thierry, Vaz, Mendy, Echouafni and Ollé-Nicolle are the club's most successful managers in terms of trophies won, with one each. Farid Benstiti holds the club record for most games managed, with 126.

Managers

As of 18 March 2023.

Missing data from managers between 1971 and 1999.

Honours

As of the 2021–22 Coupe de France Final.

References

External links

Official websites
PSG.FR - Site officiel du Paris Saint-Germain
Paris Saint-Germain (Women) - UEFA.com